Scone  is a town in the Upper Hunter Shire in the Hunter Region of New South Wales, Australia. At the 2006 census, Scone had a population of 5,624 people. It is on the New England Highway north of Muswellbrook about 270 kilometres north of Sydney, and is part of the New England (federal) and Upper Hunter (state) electorates. Scone is in a farming area and is also noted for breeding Thoroughbred racehorses. It is known as the 'Horse capital of Australia'.

History

Allan Cunningham was the first recorded European person to travel into the Scone area, reaching the Upper Dartbrook and Murrurundi areas in 1823. Surveyor Henry Dangar travelled through the area, prior to passing over the Liverpool Range above Murrurundi in 1824. The first properties in the area were Invermein and Segenhoe in 1825. The town initially started as the village of Redbank in 1826 and in 1831 Hugh Cameron, a Scottish descendant put forward the name of Scone to Thomas Mitchell. It was gazetted as Scone in 1837 and during the early days was renowned for its large pastoral properties including Belltrees and Segenhoe. Early buildings were St Luke's Church, Scone Post Office, the Old Court Theatre (that is now a hall for musicals and plays), and the St Aubins' Inn.

Scone Shire was merged into the Upper Hunter Shire in 2004, integrating parts of the former Murrurundi and Merriwa shires.

The annual Scone Horse Festival is a celebration of Scone's cultural links to equines. It is celebrated during May and includes all manner of activities, including wine tours, Open Days across the numerous horse studs in the area, the Scone rodeo, the Scone School Horse Sports competition, the Black Tie Ball, and a parade in Kelly Street.

The main event is a horse racing carnival featuring the prestigious Scone Cup, one of the richest country racing days in New South Wales and Australia. Small celebrations are also a key part of the festival and include schools, businesses, public events and sports centres. The Horse Festival is also traditionally linked with such events as the Belltrees poetry competition, the yarns night and many other small annual fundraisers and events. Scone also hosts the Inglis Guineas Day, a major race meet, in the middle of May.

The town is also home to some of the very old pony clubs and is known for a happening polo club. Besides these, the region is well known for its dairies and wineries.

Belltrees Country House 
Located on Gundy Road and is heritage listed.  The property is 23,000  acre farm. In 1830 Hamilton Sempill was granted the land and called Belltree after an estate of an ancestor. After Sempill returned to England, it was owned by  explorer W C Wentworth. In 1853, Wentworth sold the estate to the sons of John White. Designed J W Pender for Henry Luke White in 1906. In 1912 it was 160,000 enclosed with 3,200 km fencing and 64 buildings.

Currently on the property there is a homestead built in 1908, St James chapel (1887), the original homestead which is now a museum, a trading store (1837) turned into an office, a shearing shed (1880) and a primary school.   Patrick White used the property as inspiration for his novel The Eye of the Storm (1973). In 1994 the property became the set for the film A Matter of Honour.

St Aubin's Arms 
In  1836 Thomas and Henry Dangar leased 6 acres of property at St Aubin's Village from Captain William Dumaresq. It was built in 1837 and is a pub located on 245 Kelly Street. The first name was "The Bird in Hand' and the first owner was James Briggs until 1838. There was seven rooms with attached attics, and a small paddock and stockyard. In 1838 the pub was owned by George Chivers. In 1840 the pub was robbed by the Jewboy gang. In 1842, John P Wilkie brought the property and renamed it the White Swan Inn. In 1888 the house was built on the property. In 1917 it was put on market but did not sell due to World War I. In 1938 the house was purchased. The property sits on 4 acres of land. It is a brick building with high ceilings, wide verandahs, cedar joinery and an underground cellar. In the 1960s an additional wing was added. The property now has five bedrooms, a library, lounge and dining areas.

Turanville Estate 
William Danger purchased 800 acres and was given permission to  purchase the 1800  acres adjacent to the property.  It was well known  for horse-breeding – producing racehorses and remounts for the Indian Army and attracted clientele from around the world.  Built in the early 1870s with 12 rooms and offices.  In 1888,  a telephone line was installed to connect Turanville to Scone; it was the first connection to Scone from a property. In 1854, Thomas  Cook started to work on the property. In 1889, Thomas Cook  inherited  the property from his uncle William Dangar.  After Cook inherited the property, it reached around 10,000 acres; he also built a homestead and gardens. During the 1900s, a new roof made out iron with a front porch was added to replace the shingled one. In 1912, the property was sold to Hugh Corbett Taylor, whose great grandson still lives on the property. In 1938, Helen Ethel Moore and Douglas Hamilton Robertson took over the property.  In 1946, a renovation occurred which included demolishing the separate kitchen block and adding a southern wing to the house. In 1963, Jock Douglas Roberyson and his Elizabeth took over running the property. Since 2003, Douglas Hugh Robertson and his Nicola now run the property.

Heritage listings 
Scone has a number of heritage-listed sites, including:
 144 Kelly Street: Scone Civic Theatre
 41 Kingdon Road: Old Court Theatre
 117 Liverpool Street: Scone Post Office
 Main Northern railway: Scone railway station

Education
One of the first educational groups to be established in New South Wales was a reading society, The Scone Book Society, formed in 1841. This later became the Scone School of Arts, a Mechanics' Institute and library, which occupied buildings in Kingdon Street (1873-1917) and Kelly Street (1924-1954).

Present-day schools include:
 Scone Public School
 Scone High School
 St Mary's Scone
 Scone Grammar School

There is also a campus of Hunter Institute of TAFE.

Transport
Scone lies on the Main North railway line, and is served by a passenger train service made up of a daily NSW TrainLink train to Sydney and local regular NSW TrainLink services to Newcastle.

The town is connected to nearby Gloucester via Scone Road, which traverses the Barrington Tops.

Scone Airport (ICAO code YSCO, IATA code NSO) is located 3.5 kilometers Northwest of the town center. The airport has a 1404 meter asphalt runway. It hosts an aeroclub, a flight school, a warbird collection (Hunter Warbirds) but does not currently have any scheduled airline service.

Climate
Scone has a humid subtropical (Cfa) with warm to hot summers and cool winters. Rainfall is less common in winter than in summer due to the foehn effect, as the town lies on the leeward side of the Great Dividing Range.

See also
 Scone railway station, New South Wales
 Scone Thoroughbreds

References

External links

  providing images of properties near Scone
 Scone area visitor information centre

 
Suburbs of Upper Hunter Shire
Towns in the Hunter Region